Sidama or Sidaamu Afoo is an Afro-Asiatic language belonging to the Highland East Cushitic branch of the Cushitic family. It is spoken in parts of southern Ethiopia by the Sidama people, particularly in the densely populated Sidama National Regional State (SNRS). Sidaamu Afoo is the ethnic autonym for the language, while Sidaminya is its name in Amharic. Although it is not known to have any specific dialects, it shares over 64% lexical similarity with Alaba-K'abeena, 62% with Kambaata, and 53% with Hadiyya, all of which are other languages spoken in southwestern Ethiopia. The word order is typically SOV. Sidaama has over 100,000 L2 speakers. The literacy rate for L1 speakers is 1%-5%, while for L2 speakers it is 20%. In terms of its writing, Sidaama used an Ethiopic script up until 1993, from which point forward it has used a Latin script.

The term Sidamo has also been used by some authors to refer to larger groupings of East Cushitic and even Omotic languages. The languages within this Sidamo grouping contain similar, alternating phonological features. The results from a research study conducted in 1968-1969 concerning mutual intelligibility between different Sidamo languages suggest that Sidaama is more closely related to the Gedeo language, which it shares a border with to the south, than other Sidamo languages. According to Ethnologue, the two languages share a lexical similarity of 60%. Sidaama vocabulary has been influenced by Oromo vocabulary.

Phonology

Consonants 

 Other consonant sounds /p/ and /v/ are only heard from loanwords.
 Gemination is also present for most consonants (e.g. /tː, kː, pʼː/).
 /ɾ/ can also be heard as a trill [rː] when geminated.

Vowels

Grammar

Noun Phrases 
In Sidaama, not all noun phrases have nouns. This can occur when it is so obvious what kind of thing the referent of the noun phrase is, that it is unnecessary for the speaker to mention it. Sidaama has two types of noun phrases without nouns. One type is made up only of an adjective or a numeral, where the adjective or the numeral agrees in case, number, and gender with the referent of a noun phrase. This is shown in the examples below:

The other type of noun phrase without a noun is formed with a noun-phrase clitic, or NPC. This NPC starts with t (FEM) or h (MASC). This is thought to originate from the Afro-Asiatic demonstrative containing t (FEM) or k (MASC). The Sidaama NPC appears in various forms. Which form is used then depends on the gender of the referent of the noun phrase, and the syntactic role or case of the noun phrase. When a noun phrase without a noun is formed with an NPC, both the speaker and the listener know its referent. In this case, the NPC attaches to the end of a genitive noun phrase or relative clause to form a noun phrase without a noun. This is shown in the examples below:

References

Grammars 
 Abebe Gebre-Tsadik (1982) "Derived nominals in Sidamo," B.A. thesis, Addis Ababa University. Addis Ababa.
 Abebe Gebre-Tsadik. 1985. "An overview of the morphological structure of Sidamo verbs," The verb morphophonemics of five highland east Cushitic languages, including Burji. Afrikanistische Arbeitspapiere 2. Cologne: Institut für Afrikanistik.  Pages 64–81.
 Anbessa Teferra (1984) "Sidamo verb morphology," B.A. thesis, Addis Ababa University. Addis Ababa.
 Anbessa Teferra.  2000.  "A grammar of Sidaama," Doctoral dissertation. Jerusalem, Israel: The Hebrew University.
 ANBESSA TEFERRA, Sidaama (Sidaamu Afoo), Languages of the World/Materials, 501 (München: LINCOM GmbH, 2014); 109 pp.
 Cerulli, Enrico (1938) La Lingua e la Storia del Sidamo (Studi Etiopici II). Rome: Istituto per l’Oriente.
 Cohen, Marcel (1927) "Du verbe sidama (dans le groupe couchitique)," Bulletin de la Société de la Linguistique de Paris 83: 169-200.
 Gasparini, Armido (1978) Grammatica Practica della Lingua Sidamo. Awasa (Mimeographed: 127 pp.).
 Kramer, Ruth, and Anbessa Teferra. "Gender switch in Sidaama." Journal of Afroasiatic Languages and Linguistics 12, no. 2 (2020): 286-327.
 Kawachi, Kazuhiro (2007) "A grammar of Sidaama (Sidamo), a Cushitic language of Ethiopia," Doctoral dissertation. State University of New York at Buffalo.
 Moreno, Martino Mario (1940) Manuale di Sidamo. Milan: Mondadori.

Dictionaries 
 ACADEMY OF ETHIOPIAN LANGUAGES AND CULTURES, Sidaamu Afii Dikshinere (‘Sidaama monolingual dictionary’) (Addis Ababa: Academy of Ethiopian Languages and Cultures, Addis Ababa University, 2015)
 Gasparini, Armido (1983) Sidamo-English dictionary. Bologna, Italy: E.M.I.
 Hudson, Grover (1989) Highland East Cushitic Dictionary (Kuschitische Sprachstudien 7). Hamburg: Buske.
 Sileshi Worqineh and Yohannis Latamo (1995) Sidaamu-Amaaru-Ingilizete Afii Qaalla Taashsho [Sidaama–Amharic–English Dictionary]. Awasa: Sidaamu Zoone Wogattenna Isporte Biddishsha [Sidaama Zone Sports and Culture Department].
 Kjell Magne Yri, & Steve Pepper. (2019). dictionaria/sidaama: Sidaama Dictionary (Version v1.0) [Data set]. Zenodo.

Bible translations 
 British and Foreign Bible Society (1933) St. Mark’s Gospel in Sidamo. London.
 Ethiopian Bible Society (1984) HaÌro GondoÌro [New Testament of Sidamo]. Addis Ababa.

Sociolinguistics and pragmatics
 ANBESSA TEFERRA. Women’s Language of Avoidance and Some Other Sidaama Endangered Cultural Practices. Journal of Afroasiatic Languages 6/1 (2016), 59–78.
 FEKEDE MENUTA GEWTA. The sociolinguistics and pragmatics of greetings in Sidama. Journal of Languages and Culture 7/3 (2016), 28–36.
 NIGUSSIE MESHESHA MITIKE and KJELL MAGNE YRI. Sociopolitical Discourse and Communication in Sidaama Folk Media. in Multilingual Ethiopia 339–357.
 YRI, KJELL MAGNE. School Grammars with Everyday Vocabulary: Suggestion for a Culture Specific Approach, with Sidaamu Afoo as an example. in Multilingual Ethiopia 319–338.

External links 
 Bibliography of Highland East Cushitic by Grover Hudson at the Michigan State University website.
 PanAfrican L10n page on Sidamo

East Cushitic languages
Languages of Ethiopia
Subject–object–verb languages
Sidama Region